The Law Reform (Personal Injuries) Act 1948 is an Act of the Parliament of the United Kingdom. It was passed during the Labour government of Clement Attlee. It improved the legal position of employees suffering from work-related accidents. In particular, it abolished the doctrine of common employment and repealed the Employers’ Liability Act, 1880.

References

United Kingdom Acts of Parliament 1948
Personal injury
Law reform in the United Kingdom